Ranza Clark (married Boileau; born December 13, 1961 in Calgary, Alberta) is a retired middle distance runner from Canada, who won the gold medal in the women's 1.500 metres at the 1983 Pan American Games. She represented her native country at the 1984 Summer Olympics, finishing in 15th place in the women's 800 metres.

Achievements

External links 
 Profile at Sports Reference

1961 births
Living people
Canadian female middle-distance runners
Athletes from Calgary
Athletes (track and field) at the 1983 Pan American Games
Athletes (track and field) at the 1984 Summer Olympics
Athletes (track and field) at the 1990 Commonwealth Games
Olympic track and field athletes of Canada
Pan American Games track and field athletes for Canada
Pan American Games medalists in athletics (track and field)
Pan American Games gold medalists for Canada
Pan American Games silver medalists for Canada
Medalists at the 1983 Pan American Games
Commonwealth Games competitors for Canada